Marouf, the Cairo Cobbler is a 1947 Moroccan film directed by Jean Mauran. It was entered into the 1947 Cannes Film Festival.

Cast
 Tawfik Filali
 Mohammed Touri
 Leila Wehby

References

External links

1947 films
Moroccan drama films
1940s French-language films
Moroccan black-and-white films
Fiction about shoemakers